Danny Crossman (born January 17, 1967) is an American football coach who is the special teams coordinator for the Miami Dolphins of the National Football League (NFL). Previously, he served as special teams coordinator for the Carolina Panthers (2007–2009), Detroit Lions (2010–2012), and Buffalo Bills (2013–2018).

Playing career
Crossman was a second-team all-America and all-Big East cornerback at Pittsburgh. He lettered two seasons (1987 and 1989) as a defensive back and one (1988) as the Panthers’ starting fullback. As a senior, he served as team captain and was named the squad’s MVP as he led the Panthers to the 1989 Sun Bowl. He also played one season at Kansas, where he was a Freshman All-America by The Sporting News in 1985 before following KU head coach Mike Gottfried to Pittsburgh.

Crossman signed as a free agent with the Washington Redskins in 1990. He made the squad, but was put on injured reserve after just three games. He also spent time on injured reserve with the Detroit Lions in 1991 and 1992.

He captained the London Monarchs of the World League of American Football in 1991 and 1992, earning All-League honors. He recorded three interceptions and earned MVP honors in the inaugural World Bowl, leading the Monarchs to the league title.

Coaching career
Crossman began his coaching career at the U.S. Coast Guard Academy in 1993 where he coached the defensive backs and special teams. Crossman spent 2003-2009 as a member of the Carolina Panthers coaching staff.  He was the Panthers special teams coordinator over his last 5 seasons with the team.  Crossman was hired by the Detroit Lions in 2010 as special teams coordinator.  On September 30, 2012, against the Lions, the Minnesota Vikings returned a kickoff and a punt for a touchdown for the first time in a single game in franchise history.

On February 8, 2019, the Miami Dolphins announced Crossman as their special teams coordinator. He received an additional title of assistant head coach on March 11, 2021.

Personal life
Crossman earned his bachelor's degree in business administration and communications from Pittsburgh in 1990. He and his wife, Susan, have a son, Kyle, and a daughter, Kaylie.

References

External links
Carolina Panthers bio

1967 births
Living people
People from El Paso, Texas
Kansas Jayhawks football players
Pittsburgh Panthers football players
London Monarchs players
UCF Knights football coaches
Western Kentucky Hilltoppers football coaches
Georgia Tech Yellow Jackets football coaches
Michigan State Spartans football coaches
Carolina Panthers coaches
Detroit Lions coaches
Buffalo Bills coaches
Miami Dolphins coaches